DreamFactory Software is a Las Vegas, Nevada-based software company. DreamFactory develops both commercial and open source software that provides integration-platform-as-a-service to multiple applications in cloud-based or on premise environments. DreamFactory may be deployed on premise or in the company's cloud environment.

History
DreamFactory Software was founded in 1998 by technology entrepreneur Bill Appleton. DreamFactory™ is the namesake of the proprietary authoring software Appleton developed during his tenure as president of Cyberflix. The software was used in Cyberflix’s CD-ROM video game Titanic: Adventure Out of Time. Appleton currently serves as the company’s president. DreamFactory is a private, venture-backed company based in Campbell, California, with an additional development center in Atlanta.

In 2013, the company launched DreamFactory Services Platform (DSP) to connect mobile apps to enterprise back-end infrastructures in the cloud. It provides a standards-based service palette and can be installed on any cloud or enterprise datacenter.

The DreamFactory legacy suite includes cloud development for IT; release management and data migration for administrators; visual studio for operations; and project, document and performance management for teams. The company’s products integrate with Salesforce.com, Windows Azure, Cisco Connect, Intuit and Amazon Web Services.  Clients include Salesforce.com, Nike, Apple Computer, American Express, and Merck.

Now under new ownership, DreamFactory has evolved into an integration-platform-as-a-service offering an enterprise platform for creating and managing multiple database APIs. Furthermore the platform has developed several new security features that allows DreamFactory users to work hand in glove with all modern authentication services such as Active Directory, OAuth, Okta and many more. Along with standard database API creation, DreamFactory integrates with file storage services, email providers, IoT devices, caching services and any third party APIs via a HTML universal connector.

Funding
DreamFactory took on a $5.6 million Series A round of funding from New Enterprise Associates in 2006. Greg Papadopoulos, former chief technology officer at Sun Microsystems and a partner at NEA, sat on the DreamFactory board during this time.

In 2018 DreamFactory was acquired by Xenon Partners, a tech-centric private equity fund that has funded companies such as Right Signature, Dropbox and Earth Class Mail.

Open Source Version
With the release of 3.0, DreamFactory's open source version has seen the biggest development in the platforms history. Several popular features which were free and open sourced were required to be moved to the commercial license due to an increased demand in support services for particular elements such as MySQL and scripting. While they claim that there was an official announcement the open source community was highly furious on their official forum for the lack of transparency  and while there was some consternation regarding the removal of these features, DreamFactory OSS is still frequently downloaded via github and the AWS marketplace. The OSS community believes that the features which were part of the OSS license were made commercial which is illegal and require media and legal attention.

Commercial Version 

DreamFactory offers a Silver and Gold license as part of Small Business, Professional or Enterprise packages that differentiate themselves in terms of their ongoing support and configuration services. The primary feature differentiation between Silver and Gold is the addition of logging, limiting, auditing and scheduling capabilities held within the Gold license.

Recent version releases have focused on enhanced UI, bespoke connectors as well as refined scripting engines. Users of the DreamFactory commercial product include such names as Monin, McKesson, Intel, E.C. Barton and many more.

References

External links 
 

Software companies based in California
Software companies established in 1998
Defunct software companies of the United States